The Akola Municipal Corporation is the governing body of the city of Akola in the Indian state of Maharashtra. The municipal corporation consists of democratically elected members, is headed by a mayor and administers the city's infrastructure, public services and police. Members from the state's leading various political parties hold elected offices in the corporation. 
Akola municipal corporation is located in Akola. Akola Municipal Corporation has been formed with functions to improve the infrastructure of town.

Revenue sources 

The following are the Income sources for the corporation from the Central and State Government.

Revenue from taxes 
Following is the Tax related revenue for the corporation.

 Property tax.
 Profession tax.
 Entertainment tax.
 Grants from Central and State Government like Goods and Services Tax.
 Advertisement tax.

Revenue from non-tax sources 

Following is the Non Tax related revenue for the corporation.

 Water usage charges.
 Fees from Documentation services.
 Rent received from municipal property.
 Funds from municipal bonds.

Corporation Election 2017

Political performance in Election 2017  
The results of Election 2017 are shown in the following table.

List of Mayor

List of Deputy Mayor

Municipal limit extension 

The municipal limit of Akola Municipal Corporation was finalized to be extended on 30 Aug 2016 taking into the Municipal area surrounding 24 suburbs and villages. This has raised the area to 128 km2 and population to 537,137. The Municipal region is thus subdivided into 20 wards with 4 members for each accounting 80 total seats.

References 

Akola
Municipal corporations in Maharashtra
Year of establishment missing